Chris Hanna is the name of:
 Chris Hanna (RAAF), a double recipient of the Conspicuous Service Cross (Australia)
 Chris Hanna, one of the members of the CKY crew

See also
 Kris Hanna